
Dąbrowa County is a unit of territorial administration and local government (powiat) in Lesser Poland Voivodeship, southern Poland. It was created on 1 January 1999 as a result of the Polish local government reforms passed in 1998.

As of 2019 its total population is 59,227, out of which the population of Dąbrowa Tarnowska is 11,889, that of Szczucin is 4,157, and the rural population is 43,181.

Neighbouring counties
Dąbrowa County is bordered by Busko County and Staszów County to the north, Mielec County and Dębica County to the east, Tarnów County to the south, and Kazimierza County to the west.

Administrative division
The county is subdivided into seven gminas (two urban-rural and five rural). These are listed in the following table, in descending order of population.

See also
List of villages in Dąbrowa County

References

 
Land counties of Lesser Poland Voivodeship